The legislative districts of Davao del Norte are the representation of the province of Davao del Norte in the various national legislatures of the Philippines. The province is currently represented in the lower house of the Congress of the Philippines through its first and second congressional districts.

History 

Prior to gaining separate representation, areas now under the jurisdiction of Davao del Norte were represented under the Department of Mindanao and Sulu (1917–1935) and the historical Davao Province (1935–1967).

The enactment of Republic Act No. 4867 on May 8, 1967, split the old Davao Province into Davao del Norte, Davao del Sur and Davao Oriental. Per Section 4 of R.A. 4867, the incumbent Davao Province representative was to indicate which of the three new provinces he wished to continue to represent; Rep. Lorenzo Sarmiento chose to represent Davao del Norte. Davao del Sur (grouped together with Davao City) and Davao Oriental were separately represented beginning in the second half of the 6th Congress after special elections were held on November 14, 1967, to fill their new congressional seats.

Davao del Norte — officially renamed to "Davao" in 1972 — was represented in the Interim Batasang Pambansa as part of Region XI from 1978 to 1984. The province returned three representatives, elected at-large, to the Regular Batasang Pambansa in 1984.

Under the new Constitution which was proclaimed on February 11, 1987, the province was reapportioned into three congressional districts; each district elected its member to the restored House of Representatives starting that same year.

Apart from restoring the name of the province to Davao del Norte, the passage of Republic Act No. 8470 and its subsequent ratification by plebiscite on March 7, 1998, separated the province's eleven eastern municipalities to create the new province of Compostela Valley (now named Davao de Oro). Per Section 3 of Republic Act No. 8470, Davao del Norte's own representation was reduced to two districts. The newly reconfigured districts elected their own representatives beginning in the 1998 elections.

1st District 
City: Tagum
Municipalities: Asuncion, Kapalong, New Corella, Talaingod, San Isidro (established 2004)
Population (2020):  542,642

Notes

1987–1998 

Municipalities: Compostela, Maragusan (San Mariano), Montevista, Monkayo, New Bataan, Mawab, Nabunturan

2nd District 
Cities: Panabo (became city 2001), Samal
Municipalities: Braulio E. Dujali, Carmen, Santo Tomas
Population (2020): 572,415

1987–1998 

Municipalities: Asuncion, Laak (San Vicente), Mabini, New Corella, Pantukan, Tagum (became city 1998), Maco

3rd District (defunct) 
Municipalities: Babak (annexed to Samal 1998), Carmen, Kapalong, Kaputian (annexed to Samal 1998), Panabo, Samal (Peñaplata) (became city 1998), Santo Tomas, Talaingod (established 1991), Braulio E. Dujali (established 1998)

Lone District (defunct) 
 includes the present-day province of Davao de Oro

Notes

At-Large (defunct) 
 includes the present-day province of Davao de Oro

See also 
Legislative district of Mindanao and Sulu
Legislative district of Davao
Legislative districts of Davao de Oro

References 

Davao Del Norte
Politics of Davao del Norte